Mike Mahoney (born September 7, 1951) is a former American college football player and coach. He served as head football coach at Murray State University (MSU) from 1987 to 1992, compiling an overall record of 23–41–1.

Head coaching record

References

1951 births
Living people
People from Uxbridge, Massachusetts
Sportspeople from Worcester County, Massachusetts
Players of American football from Massachusetts
American football defensive tackles
Southern Connecticut State Owls football players
Coaches of American football from Massachusetts
Arizona Wildcats football coaches
William & Mary Tribe football coaches
Murray State Racers football coaches